Carlos Manuel Lezcano (born September 30, 1955), is a former professional baseball player who played outfielder in Major League Baseball (MLB) from 1980 to 1981 for the Chicago Cubs. His cousin, Sixto Lezcano, was also a Major League outfielder and was a recipient of a Rawlings Gold Glove Award in 1979 while a member of the Milwaukee Brewers.

Early life
He was born in Arecibo, Puerto Rico.

Manager
He was most recently the manager of the Lake Elsinore Storm, a minor league affiliate of the San Diego Padres. On November 29, 2013, the Cangrejeros de Santurce announced that Lezcano would replace José David Flores as manager of the team.

On January 12, 2015, Lezcano was announced as the manager for the Joplin Blasters as they begin American Association play in 2015.

For the 2016 summer Carlos Lezcano is the head coach for the Liberal Bee Jays located in Liberal, Kansas. The Bee Jays play in the Jayhawk League, which involves college players from around the United States.

See also
 List of Major League Baseball players from Puerto Rico

References

External links

1955 births
Living people
Chicago Cubs players
Major League Baseball outfielders
Major League Baseball players from Puerto Rico
Florida State University alumni
Minor league baseball managers
Midland Cubs players
Wichita Aeros players
Iowa Oaks players
Iowa Cubs players
People from Arecibo, Puerto Rico
Birmingham Barons players
Tacoma Tigers players